Alcón (Spanish: los Alcónes, English: the Alcóns) is a surname. Notable people with the surname include:

Alfredo Alcón (1930–2014), Argentine actor
Manuel Alcón (died 1962), Argentine actor and musician